George Johnston (4 November 1869 – 9 November 1956) was an Australian rules footballer who played with Melbourne in the Victorian Football League (VFL).

Notes

External links 
		
George Johnstone's profile at Demonwiki	

Australian rules footballers from Victoria (Australia)
Melbourne Football Club players
1869 births
1956 deaths